Marek Kolba (born January 14, 1980) is a Slovak ice hockey player who is currently playing for the HK Dukla Michalovce in the Tipsport Liga.

External links

1980 births
Living people
HC '05 Banská Bystrica players
Ducs de Dijon players
HK Dukla Michalovce players
HC Havířov players
HC Košice players
MHC Martin players
HK Poprad players
Slovak ice hockey defencemen
HC Slovan Bratislava players
Sportspeople from Poprad
MsHK Žilina players
Slovak expatriate ice hockey players in Canada
Slovak expatriate ice hockey players in the Czech Republic
Expatriate ice hockey players in France
Slovak expatriate sportspeople in France